The Cypriot Women's Volleyball National Division is the major volleyball national competition for women in Cyprus, established in 1975. It is organised by the Cyprus Volleyball Federation (Kypriaki Omospondia Petosfairisis-KOP).

History
In the 2018/19 season in Division A 8 teams had participated: "Anorthosis (Famagusta/Limasol), AEL (Limasol), AEC (Larnaca), Apollo (Limasol), Olympiada (Nicosia), Paphiakos Theodorou (Paphos), TOI (Avgorou), Anagennesi (Derinha). The championship title was won by Anorthosis for the second time in a row. The 2nd place went to the AEL, the 3rd to the AEC.

Winners list

Table by Club

References

External links
Cyprus Volleyball Association 
 Cyprus Division 1. women.volleybox.net 

 

Cyprus
Volleyball in Cyprus
Cyprus National Division 1